Amelia Vega Polanco (born 7 November 1984) is a Dominican model, actress, author, singer and beauty queen. At the age of 18, she won the Miss Universe 2003 pageant, becoming the first ever Miss Universe from the Dominican Republic, as well as the youngest winner since 1994. She is married to Al Horford.

Miss Universe

After winning the Miss Dominican Republic title, Vega represented the Dominican Republic in the Miss Universe 2003 pageant held in Panama City on 3 June 2003.  She became the first delegate from this country to win the title. At the time she was the youngest woman since 1994 to win Miss Universe and, as of 2023, is the tallest winner, standing at 6'2".

Music
After recording her first demo at 15 years old and starting her artistic career on musicals in her hometown at the same age, Amelia's first single "Pasa Un Segundito" was released by iTunes on 26 April 2010. It became a top Latin song in just two days. A couple months later she surprises with her environmental song Smog. She announced on her Twitter account that her complete album "Agua Dulce" will be released on 30 August 2011, first on iTunes. She began promoting her music in Puerto Rico, Ecuador, Panama, Dominican Republic "where she opened the concert for Marc Anthony And Chayanne in front of a crowd of 50,000 people".

Personal life
On 24 December 2011, Vega married Dominican NBA player Al Horford, after two years of dating. They have four children together and are expecting their fifth child.

Vega is niece-in-law of the Grammy Award–winning singer Juan Luis Guerra. She attended and graduated from Barbizon Modeling and Acting School in Santo Domingo.

Vega is the sixth generation of women in her family who bears Amelia either as their first name or middle name.

Vega's parents are second cousins-twice removed and both are descended from Cuban-born brothers José Nicolás Vega y Pichardo and José Rafael Vega y Pichardo;  her ancestry is 53/64 Dominican, 3/64 Cuban and 1/8 (or 8/64) Lebanese. Vega's ancestry can be traced back to the English King, William the Conqueror, and the Castilian King Alfonso X through her Cuban ancestors.

Filmography
 Homie Spumoni (2006) .... Amelia Vega as (Chanice)
 The Lost City (2005) .... Minerva Eros

Notes

References

External links

 Official website
 
  Miss Universe 2003-related Website
 

1984 births
Living people
Dominican Republic beauty pageant winners
21st-century Dominican Republic women singers
Dominican Republic people of Spanish descent
Dominican Republic people of Galician descent
Dominican Republic people of Cuban descent
Dominican Republic people of Lebanese descent
Members of the Church of God Ministry of Jesus Christ International
Miss Dominican Republic
Miss Universe 2003 contestants
Miss Universe winners
People from Santiago de los Caballeros
White Dominicans